Seyyed Mohammad Ali Ale-Hashem (Persian: سید محمدعلی آل‌هاشم), also known as "Ayatollah Ale-Hashem" (born: 1962, in Tabriz), is the representative of Vali-e-Faqih (Guardianship of the Islamic Jurist) in the province of East Azerbaijan, and Imam of Friday Prayer in Tabriz.

Ale-Hashem passed his education (till high school) in his city, afterwards moved to Qom in order to educate at Hawzah. This Iranian Twelver Shia cleric who was present at Iran-Iraq War, possesses the educational degree of Hawzah at "level 4" (Doctoral). Likewise, he passed his Kharij-Feqh lessen (of Hawzah) at the classes of Iran's supreme leader, Seyyed Ali Khamenei. He was also the head of "Political Ideological Organization of the Islamic Republic of Iran's Army" before being appointed at the position of Vali-e-Faqih representative in East-Azerbaijan and Tabriz Imam-Jom'ah.

See also 
 Seyed Mehdi Ghoreishi
 Hassan Ameli

References 

Living people
Representatives of the Supreme Leader in the Provinces of Iran
Shia clerics from Tabriz
1962 births
Iranian ayatollahs
Combatant Clergy Association politicians
Politicians from Tabriz